Gonzalo Groba (born 16 February 1996) is an Argentine professional footballer who plays as a midfielder for Deportivo Riestra, on loan from Chacarita Juniors.

Career
Groba started out with Chacarita Juniors. He made his first appearances in professional football in December 2017, when the midfielder was selected off the substitutes bench in matches with Olimpo and Lanús as the club were eventually relegated from the Argentine Primera División. His first senior start came in Primera B Nacional against Almagro on 27 August 2018. In January 2022, Groba joined Deportivo Riestra on a one-year loan deal.

Career statistics
.

References

External links

1996 births
Living people
Footballers from Buenos Aires
Argentine footballers
Association football midfielders
Argentine Primera División players
Primera Nacional players
Chacarita Juniors footballers
Deportivo Riestra players